A heavy-lift launch vehicle, HLV or HLLV, is an orbital launch vehicle capable of lifting between
, operational heavy-lift launch vehicles include the Ariane 5, the Long March 5, the Proton-M and the Delta IV Heavy. In addition, the Angara A5, the Falcon 9 Full Thrust, and the Falcon Heavy are designed to provide heavy-lift capabilities in at least some configurations but have not yet been proven to carry a 20-tonne payload into LEO. Several other heavy-lift rockets are in development. An HLV is between medium-lift launch vehicles and super heavy-lift launch vehicles.

Rated launch vehicles

See also
 Comparison of orbital launch systems
 List of orbital launch systems
 Comparison of orbital rocket engines
 Comparison of space station cargo vehicles
 Medium-lift launch vehicle, capable of lifting between 2,000 and 20,000 kg (4,400 to 44,100 lb) of payload into Low Earth orbit
 Rocket
 Small-lift launch vehicle, capable of lifting up to 2,000 kg to low Earth orbit
 Sounding rocket, suborbital launch vehicle
 Spacecraft propulsion
 Super heavy-lift launch vehicle, capable of lifting more than 50,000 kg (110,000 lb) of payload into Low Earth orbit

References

Further reading
 Mallove, Eugene F. and Matloff, Gregory L. The Starflight Handbook: A Pioneer's Guide to Interstellar Travel, Wiley. .

Space launch vehicles